David McKenzie (4 July 1842 – 16 January 1919) was an Australian politician who represented the South Australian House of Assembly multi-member seat of Flinders from 1899 to 1905.

References

1842 births
1919 deaths
Members of the South Australian House of Assembly